Charles Taylor (third ¼ 1921 – November 2013) was an English professional rugby league footballer who played in the 1930s, 1940s and 1950s, and coached in the 1950s.

Background
Charlie Taylor's birth was registered in York, he served in the Royal Navy on destroyers during the Arctic convoys of World War II, and in the English Channel and Mediterranean until 1946. He worked at Rowntree's in York (latterly in their fire service department), he and his wife Renie, also a worker at Rowntree's, lived on Haley’s Terrace, York. He spent his last 8-years in a care home in Norton-on-Derwent, York, North Yorkshire, England, where he died from dementia. His funeral took place at York Crematorium, Bishopthorpe Road on 18 November 2013.

Playing career
Taylor made his first-team début aged-17 for York in the 35–0 victory over Leigh on Saturday 19 November 1938, and he played his last match for York on Saturday 20 August 20 January 1951. He played for Yorkshire against Cumberland at Recreation Ground, Whitehaven in 1950. York staged a benefit/testimonial match in Taylor's honour, against a Lionel Cooper XIII, at Clarence Street, York on Wednesday 9 May 1951. Taylor was inducted into the York Rugby League Hall of Fame in 2014, alongside Geoff Hunter, Kevin Harkin, Graham Steadman and Rich Hayes.

Genealogical information
Charlie Taylor's marriage to Gertrude I. "Renie" (née Ward) (birth registered fourth ¼ 1919 in Selby district – 1999 (aged 79–80)) was registered fourth ¼ 1941 in Selby district. They were married at Selby Abbey on Saturday 25 October 1941 and he played rugby league for York that afternoon. They had children: Pauline Taylor (birth registered first ¼  in Selby district), Michael Taylor (birth registered second ¼  in Selby district), and Kevin Taylor (birth registered fourth ¼  in York district).

References

External links
Search for "Taylor" at rugbyleagueproject.org

1921 births
2013 deaths
English rugby league players
Royal Navy personnel of World War II 
Rugby league centres
Rugby league locks
Rugby league players from York
York Wasps players
Yorkshire rugby league team players
Deaths from dementia in England